Klarobelia is a genus of flowering plants in the family Annonaceae. There are about 12 species.

Species include:
Klarobelia candida Chatrou
Klarobelia cauliflora Chatrou
Klarobelia inundata Chatrou
Klarobelia lucida (Diels) Chatrou
Klarobelia megalocarpa Chatrou
Klarobelia napoensis Chatrou
Klarobelia pandoensis Chatrou
Klarobelia pumila Chatrou
Klarobelia stipitata Chatrou
Klarobelia subglobosa Chatrou

References

 
Taxonomy articles created by Polbot